Hoshino Impul Co., Ltd., (known as Impul) is a Japanese automotive aftermarket company based in Setagaya-ku, Tokyo. Founded by Nissan's factory driver, Kazuyoshi Hoshino, the company exclusively produces aftermarket parts for Nissans, such as bodykits, engine components as well as wheels.

History
The company was founded in 1980 by the Nissan works driver, Kazuyoshi Hoshino in Maruko-cho, Shizuoka Prefecture. Within months, Impul produced its first product, the IMPUL D-01 wheel, which to promote it, it found its way on Hoshino's Gr. 5 Silvia racing competing in the Formula Silhouette, a Fuji Grand Champion support series, as well as starting a Tokyo-based sales center in Sayama-shi, Saitama-ken. A year later, that was relocated in Kichijōji, Musashino-shi.

In 1983, Hoshino formed Hoshino Racing Limited, a racing team to help promote his products and because of expansion, he relocated his company in Shimorenjaku, Mitaka as well as establishing a depot nearby.

In 1987, Impul offered its first fully tuned car, the IMPUL 630R, a tuned Y30 Gloria/Cedric.

In 2002, the racing relocated to Gotemba, Shizuoka. After that, the company began to focus on tuning cars and has since tuned the Infiniti M, which became the Impul 651S, and the Nissan Juke. Both of these examples of Impul's tuning has changes to the bumpers, engines, brakes, tires, exhaust system, among other things. VIP style is the common element Impul has incorporated on.

Motorsport
Since 1983, the company ran its own racing team which found success in domestic series such as JTCC, Formula Nippon and Super GT. Hoshino was the first driver to win in the team's R32 GT-R during a JTCC race in 1990. In addition to Hoshino, notable Impul drivers include Masahiko Kageyama (1993 Japanese Touring Car Championship winner), Satoshi Motoyama (2001, 2003 and 2005 Formula Nippon champion), Benoît Tréluyer (2006 Formula Nippon champion), Tsugio Matsuda (2007 and 2008 Formula Nippon champion), Yuji Ide, and Kohei Hirate. Its primary sponsor since 1996 is auto parts supplier Calsonic.

Complete JGTC Results 
(key) (Races in bold indicate pole position) (Races in italics indicate fastest lap)

Complete Super GT results
(key) (Races in bold indicate pole position) (Races in italics indicate fastest lap)

‡ Half points awarded as less than 75% of race distance was completed.
* Season still in progress.

See also
 Nissan
 Kazuyoshi Hoshino
 Calsonic Kansei

References

External links
 

Formula Nippon teams
Super Formula teams
Japanese auto racing teams
Automotive companies based in Tokyo
Manufacturing companies based in Tokyo
Automotive companies established in 1980
Wheel manufacturers
Automotive motorsports and performance companies
Japanese brands
Super GT teams

Toyota in motorsport
Nissan in motorsport
World Sportscar Championship teams